Jurong Single Member Constituency was a single member constituency (SMC) in the western area in Singapore mainly in Jurong and Tuas area. It had existed since the 1959 general elections by carving a portion from Bukit Timah Constituency.

In 1976, part of the constituency was carved out to form Boon Lay Constituency.

In 1997, the constituency was absorbed into Bukit Timah Group Representation Constituency.

Member of Parliament

Elections

Elections in 1990s

Elections in 1980s

Elections in 1970s

Elections in 1960s

Elections in 1950s

Note: In 1957, Singapore Malay Union (SMU) was expelled by its alliance partners consisted of UMNO and MCA for fielding a candidate in that by-election which was the reason for the elections department of Singapore to view Ahman bin Haji Subri as an independent candidate.

See also
Jurong GRC

References
Results in 1959 GE
Results in 1963 GE
Result in Third 1966 By Election (There was 3 by-elections in 1966 in different wards)
Results in 1968 GE
Results in 1972 GE
Results in 1976 GE
Results in 1980 GE
Results in 1984 GE
Results in 1988 GE
Results in 1991 GE
Brief History on Singapore Malay Union (Dissolved in the 1960s)

West Region, Singapore